Salt Lick Township is one of the fourteen townships of Perry County, Ohio, United States.  The 2000 census found 1,200 people in the township, 450 of whom lived in the unincorporated portions of the township.

Geography
Located in the southern part of the county, it borders the following townships:
Pike Township - north
Pleasant Township - northeast
Monroe Township - east
Coal Township - south
Monday Creek Township - west
Jackson Township - northwest corner

Two villages are located in Salt Lick Township: Shawnee in its center, and Hemlock in its southeast corner.

Name and history
Salt Lick Township was organized around 1823, and named for the mineral licks within its borders. It is the only Salt Lick Township statewide.

Government
The township is governed by a three-member board of trustees, who are elected in November of odd-numbered years to a four-year term beginning on the following January 1. Two are elected in the year after the presidential election and one is elected in the year before it. There is also an elected township fiscal officer, who serves a four-year term beginning on April 1 of the year after the election, which is held in November of the year before the presidential election. Vacancies in the fiscal officership or on the board of trustees are filled by the remaining trustees.

References

External links
County website

Townships in Perry County, Ohio
Townships in Ohio
1823 establishments in Ohio
Populated places established in 1823